Pluakdaeng United Football Club (Thai สโมสรฟุตบอลปลวกแดง ยูไนเต็ด ) or formerly Prachinburi Football Club (Thai สโมสรฟุตบอลจังหวัดปราจีนบุรี ) is a Thailand professional football club based in Rayong Province after relocating from Prachinburi Province in 2012. The club is currently playing in the Thai League 3 Eastern region.

History
The club was founded in 2005 but took their first steps on the Thai professional league setup in 2007 when they played in Division 2 which was at the time a league that was at step 3 and was a national league, unlike today's system of regional leagues at step 3. Prachinburi finished in third position in their debut season but missed out on promotion as only two clubs at the time were promoted.

In 2008, Prachniburi built on their debut season and won the 2008 Thailand Division 2 League (Group A) championship and the end of season playoff match against the Army Welfare team to be crowned overall champions and promotion to the 1st Division.

The club settled very well into life in a high division and came a creditable 5th place in the 2009 Thai Division 1 League campaign, staying well clear of the relegation places but still rather short on any challenge to promotion to the Thai Premier League. Things were overall looking rather well and the club seemed to be in a healthy position to build on again for the next campaign.

But 2010 would see the lowest point in Prachinburi's history to date. The local authority entered a new club, Prachinburi United, into the Regional League more or less telling Prachinburi that they weren't welcome anymore. The off-field issues appeared to move on field as well and the club came in 13th, a position that would normally keep a team in the same division, but the Thai FA decided to introduce end-of-season playoffs to determine relegation and promotion between Division 1 and the Regional League as part of a league expansion shakeup.

In the playoff's, Prachinburi were drawn to play Rangsit University JW whom themselves had struggled in earlier playoff matches at Regional League level. Prachinburi duly lost 1:0 over two legs and were relegated.

With relegation confirmed, Prachinburi in theory should have joined the Regional League Central-East Division, but due to the football associations policy of one province per league, the club had to move into the Bangkok Area Division as Prachinburi United were already allocated the Central-East spot.

Relocation

In early 2012 the club relocated to Rayong and would play at the Klaeng District Stadium. Thai web forums would also refer to the club as Prachinburi (Rayong United) FC, which would suggest that the club was preparing to play football in the province on a full-time basis. The move out of their home province seems to have been forced with the local government authority getting behind the Prachinburi United football club that was formed in 2010.

The relocation proved successful as they were promoted to Division 1 after finishing second in the Bangkok Regional league and then in the same place in the playoffs.

Honours

Domestic leagues 
 Thai League 3 Eastern Region
 Winners (1): 2020–21
 Thailand Division 2 League
 Winners (1): 2008

Stadium and locations

Season-by-season record

P = Played
W = Games won
D = Games drawn
L = Games lost
F = Goals for
A = Goals against
Pts = Points
Pos = Final position

TPL = Thai Premier League

QR1 = First Qualifying Round
QR2 = Second Qualifying Round
QR3 = Third Qualifying Round
QR4 = Fourth Qualifying Round
RInt = Intermediate Round
R1 = Round 1
R2 = Round 2
R3 = Round 3

R4 = Round 4
R5 = Round 5
R6 = Round 6
GR = Group stage
QF = Quarter-finals
SF = Semi-finals
RU = Runners-up
S = Shared
W = Winners

Players

Current squad

References

External links
 Official Website

Association football clubs established in 2005
Football clubs in Thailand
Rayong province
Prachinburi province
2005 establishments in Thailand